Claudia was an ancient Roman Vestal Virgin and the daughter of Appius Claudius Pulcher, consul in 143 BC. She intervened to save her father from attack by a group of plebeians. The crowd attempted to drag him from his chariot during the celebration of his triumph, but Claudia interposed herself between her father and the attackers and accompanied her father up to the capital.

References

Valerius Maximus, Factorum at dictorum memorabilium libri V.4.6

2nd-century BC Roman women
Vestal Virgins
Claudii Pulchri